is a Shinto shrine in the Itakiso neighborhood of the city of Wakayama in Wakayama Prefecture, Japan. It is one of the three shrines claiming the title of ichinomiya of former Kii Province. The main festival of the shrine is held annually on October 15.

Enshrined kami
The kami enshrined at Itakiso Jinja are:
 , the son of Susanoo and the god of forests and forestry
 , younger sister of Isotakeru, goddess of horticulture
 , younger sister of Isotakeru, goddess of lumber and construction

History
The origins of Itakiso Jinja are unknown. It first appears in the documentary record in an entry in the Shoku Nihongi dated 702 AD under Emperor Monmu. The shrine was originally located on what is the site of Hinokuma Shrine but during the reign of Emperor Suinin was relocated to a place called "Anomori" near its current location, and then relocated again to its present site in 713. According to the Nihon Shoki, Susanoo and his son Isotakeru had been driven out of the land of Takamagahara and had landed in Silla. However, they did not like that land, and travelled by boat to Izumo. There, Susanoo handed over the seeds of the tree he had brought from Takamagahara to Isotakeru and ordered him to sow the seeds all over Japan. Isotakeru, along with his younger sisters Oyatsuhime and Tsutomuhime, began to sow seeds all over Japan, turning the entire country into forests, finally arriving in the "country of trees", or Kii Province.

The shine is listed in the Engishiki dated 927 AD as a shrine of the highest rank, and is stated to be the ichinomiya of Kii Province. From the Muromachi period, the shrine developed a close relationship with Negoro-ji and the Shingi-SHingon sect of Buddhism. Following the Meiji restoration,I it was listed as a  under the Modern system of ranked Shinto shrines of State Shinto in 1885.

The shrine is located a five-minute walk from Idakiso Station on the Wakayama Electric Railway Kishigawa Line.

Gallery

See also
Ichinomiya
List of Shinto shrines

References

External links

Official homepage
Wakayama Jinja Honcho
 Wakayama Prefectural Government website

Shinto shrines in Wakayama Prefecture
Kii Province
Wakayama (city)
Ichinomiya
Beppyo shrines